Suresh Kumar (born February 1955) was appointed the Assistant Commerce Secretary for Trade Promotion and Director-General of the U.S. Foreign Commercial Service by President Barack Obama on 12 February 2010.

He joined Oliver Wyman as partner in 2013. 

https://www.oliverwyman.com/media-center/2013/former-us-assistant-secretary-of-commerce-suresh-kumar-joins-oli.html

Early life and education 
Suresh Kumar was born in Secunderabad, India. His father was an Army Officer and his mother a musician. He spent the early part childhood in Delhi, where he attended Delhi's St. Columba's School. He obtained a bachelor's degree in Economics from Delhi University, an MBA from Jamnalal Bajaj Institute of Management Studies, and is an alumnus of the Thunderbird International Consortium Program. Between 1970 and 1985 Kumar was news and sports anchor on national television in India.

References 

Delhi University alumni
St. Columba's School, Delhi alumni
People from Hyderabad district, India
Indian emigrants to the United States
1955 births
Living people
American people of Indian descent
American businesspeople